The Kuparuk River Oil Field, or Kuparuk, located in North Slope Borough, Alaska, United States, is the second largest oil field in North America by area. It started production in 1982, peaking in 1992. It is named for the Kuparuk River.

Production History
In April 1969 Sinclair Oil discovered oil at the Ugnu Number 1 well, named for the nearby Ugnuravik River. Oil was found in the Kuparuk sandstone on the Colville structure. 

In 1979  ARCO announced first production, and planned to start in 1982. Production actually began December 13, 1981, on five small gravel drilling pads.
For the first six months of 2017 production averaged  with a water cut of 87.4 percent. During the first half of 2019 the pool averaged  with a water cut of 88.7 percent.

See also
Prudhoe Bay Oil Field
Trans-Alaskan Pipeline System
Tarn Oil Field

References

Further reading
 Jamison, H.C., Brockett, L.D., and McIntosh, R.A., 1980, Prudhoe Bay - A 10-Year Perspective, in Giant Oil and Gas Fields of the Decade: 1968-1978, AAPG Memoir 30, Tulsa: American Association of Petroleum Geologists, .

External links
 USGS report on the Oil and Gas Resources of the Arctic Alaska Petroleum Province

Oil fields in Alaska
Industry in the Arctic
Geography of North Slope Borough, Alaska